Basantapur High School is a secondary school in Tribeni Union, Shailkupa Upazila, Jhenaidah District, Bangladesh. It was established in 1948 by Moulavi Md. Tofael Uddin Mollah, a Basantapur native.

References

Schools in Jhenaidah District
High schools in Bangladesh
Educational institutions established in 1948
1948 establishments in East Pakistan